Ijeoma John is a Nigerian paralympian athlete. She won silver medal at the 40 kg category of the powerlifting event at 2004 Summer Paralympics.

References 

Paralympic athletes of Nigeria
Paralympic silver medalists for Nigeria
Living people
Medalists at the 2004 Summer Paralympics
Year of birth missing (living people)
Paralympic medalists in powerlifting
Powerlifters at the 2004 Summer Paralympics
21st-century Nigerian women